The Marshall Covered Bridge is a single span Burr arch truss covered bridge structure that was built by Joseph A. Britton & Son in 1917.

It was added to the National Register of Historic Places in 1978.

Gallery

See also
 List of Registered Historic Places in Indiana
 Parke County Covered Bridges
 Parke County Covered Bridge Festival

References

External links

Parke County Covered Bridge Festival

Covered bridges on the National Register of Historic Places in Parke County, Indiana
Bridges completed in 1917
1917 establishments in Indiana
Historic district contributing properties in Indiana
Wooden bridges in Indiana
Burr Truss bridges in the United States